Robert Balfour of Balbirnie (1698–1766), from Fife, Scotland, was Member of Parliament for Midlothian (also known as Edinburghshire) from 1751 to 1754.

After his marriage to Ann Ramsay in 1736, he was styled Robert Balfour-Ramsay.  Robert was a son of George Balfour of Balbirnie and Agnes Lumsdaine.

His wife Ann was the daughter of Sir Andrew Ramsay, 4th Baronet, of Whitehill. Their surviving children were:
John Balfour, 5th of Balbirnie (1739–1813); married Mary Gordon
George Balfour, later Ramsay (1740–1806), of Whitehill
Andrew Balfour, later Ramsay (1741–1814), of Whitehill
Robert Balfour (1742–1807) of Balcurvie
General James Balfour (1743–1823), of Whitehill
Elizabeth Balfour; married Captain William Wardlaw
William Balfour (1755–1793) of the Honourable East India Company
Ann Balfour (ca. 1757–1826)

References

1698 births
1766 deaths
Members of the Parliament of Great Britain for Scottish constituencies
British MPs 1747–1754
People from Glenrothes
Robert, 4th of Balbirnie